Cabbages and Kings is a British children's historical comedy television series starring Johnny Ball, Derek Griffiths and Julie Stevens which was broadcast on BBC 1 from 1972 to 1974.

Scheduling
The programme ran for three series. The first two in 1972 and 1973 had three episodes each. The final series had five episodes.

See also
 Horrible Histories

References

BBC children's television shows
1972 British television series debuts
1974 British television series endings
1970s British children's television series